Virginia Allred Stacey Junior-Senior High School, also known as Stacey High School, is a public high school located on Lackland Air Force Base in the city of San Antonio, Texas (USA), and is classified as 2A by the UIL. This school is part of the Lackland Independent School District, which is geographically located within the boundaries of Lackland AFB, in southwestern San Antonio. In 2017, the school was rated "Met Standard" by the Texas Education Agency, with a 3-Star Distinction Designation for Academic Achievements in ELA/Reading, Science, and Top 25% Closing Performance Gaps.

Athletics
The Stacey Eagles compete in these sports - 

Basketball
Cross Country
Golf
Tennis
Track and Field
Volleyball

References

External links
 Official website

High schools in San Antonio
Public high schools in Bexar County, Texas
Joint Base San Antonio